Marco Ingrao (born 26 July 1982 in Agrigento) is a Belgian-Italian professional footballer who last played for RCS Verviétois. He normally plays as left back.

Honours
 Standard Liège
 Belgian Super Cup: 2008

References

External links
 Marco Ingrao at Footballdatabase 
 Marco Ingrao player profile at sporza.be 

1982 births
Living people
Association football defenders
Belgian people of Italian descent
Belgian footballers
Italian footballers
Belgian Pro League players
Challenger Pro League players
Eerste Divisie players
Serie B players
K.R.C. Genk players
R.A.E.C. Mons players
L.R. Vicenza players
Lierse S.K. players
Standard Liège players
MVV Maastricht players
K.A.S. Eupen players
Belgian expatriate footballers
Expatriate footballers in the Netherlands
R.C.S. Verviétois players